"My Baby Loves Me" is the title of two songs:

"My Baby Loves Me" (Martha and the Vandellas song)
"My Baby Loves Me (Just the Way That I Am)", recorded by Patricia Conroy and later Martina McBride